Fair Meadows may refer to:
 Fair Meadows (Creswell, Maryland), listed on the NRHP in Maryland
 Fair Meadows Race Track, Tulsa, Oklahoma